Yevgeni Tunik (born November 17, 1984) is the product of the Elektrostal hockey system. The young forward was also consistently part of Russia's U18 and U20 national teams.  Tunik was drafted by the New York Islanders during the 2003 NHL Entry Draft.  Since the draft he has struggled to become a regular in the Super League and has primarily skated in the second tier Russian High League.  During the summer of 2005 the young forward came over to North America and spend the 2005-06 season with the AHL's Bridgeport Sound Tigers, enjoying marginal success. After the season Tunik decided to return to Russia to continue his career .

Career statistics

Regular season and playoffs

International

References

External links 

RussianProspects.com Evgeni Tunik Player Profile

1984 births
Living people
Bridgeport Sound Tigers players
New York Islanders draft picks
People from Lyuberetsky District
Russian ice hockey centres
SKA Saint Petersburg players
Sportspeople from Moscow Oblast